Partial anterior circulation infarct (PACI) is a type of cerebral infarction affecting part of the anterior circulation supplying one side of the brain.

Partial anterior circulation stroke syndrome (PACS) refers to the symptoms of a patient who clinically appears to have had a partial anterior circulation infarct, but who has not yet had any diagnostic imaging (e.g. CT Scan) to confirm the diagnosis.

It is diagnosed by any one of the following
 2 out of 3 features of
 Higher dysfunction
 Dysphasia
 Visuospatial disturbances
 Homonymous hemianopia
 Motor and Sensory Defects (>2/3 of face, arm, leg)
 Higher dysfunction alone
 Partial Motor or Sensory Defect

If all of the above symptoms are present, a Total Anterior Circulation Infarct is more likely.

For more information, see stroke.

External links 

Stroke